Jonathan Alejandro Sánchez Hernández (born 13 March 1994) is a Mexican professional footballer who plays as a defender for Liga MX club UNAM, on loan from Liga de Expansión MX side Atlante.

Honours
Atlante
Liga de Expansión MX: Apertura 2021, Apertura 2022
Campeón de Campeones: 2022

References

External links
 

Living people
1994 births
Mexican footballers
Association football defenders
Club América footballers
Irapuato F.C. footballers
Alebrijes de Oaxaca players
Cimarrones de Sonora players
Venados F.C. players
Liga MX players
Ascenso MX players
Liga Premier de México players
Footballers from San Luis Potosí